In cricket, a batsman may retire from an innings at any time when the ball is dead; they must then be replaced by a teammate who has not been dismissed. The most common reason for retirement is if the batsman becomes injured or unwell, in which case they can resume their innings .

Retirement is covered by Law 25 of the Laws of Cricket, which distinguishes between two types of retirement. If the batsman is ill or injured they are considered retired - not out and are permitted to return to batting if they recover. In all other cases the batsman is considered retired - out and may not return to the innings, unless the opposing captain offers an exemption. These two types of retirement are considered differently in cricket statistics.

Retired - not out 
If a batting player becomes injured or falls ill (or some other exceptional circumstance forces them to leave the field), and they receive permission from the umpire, they may retire not out. If the retired batsman recovers before the end of the innings, they may resume batting, upon the dismissal or retirement of another batsman. If they cannot return to batting by the end of the innings, e.g. if they have been taken to hospital for medical treatment, the batting side must close its innings once it is all out i.e. has only one batsman who is not out and not retired. It is therefore possible for the innings to end despite the batting side only losing nine wickets (or fewer, if there are multiple retirements).

This situation is officially recorded on the scorecard as "retired - not out", though the unofficial term "retired - hurt" is often used on broadcasts instead. The batsman is considered 'not out' for statistical purposes e.g. when calculating a batting average.

Retired - out 
If a batsman retires for any other reason, or without the umpire's permission, they are considered to have forfeited their wicket and are therefore out. Unless the opposing captain offers an exemption, the retired batsmen may not return. This situation is recorded on the scorecard as 'retired - out' and is considered a dismissal for statistical purposes, though is not credited to a bowler.

Examples 
As of 2019, only two batsmen have retired out in a test match, and both instances occurred in the same innings: Sri Lankan batsmen Marvan Atapattu and Mahela Jayawardene both retired out in a match against Bangladesh in 2001. The decision was controversial, since they retired out to give the rest of the team batting practice, and this was considered unsporting.

The only example in Test cricket of an opposing captain granting an exemption was for Gordon Greenidge, during the fifth Test of the 1982–83 India–West Indies series. Greenidge was not out on a score of 154 overnight (his highest score in Tests to that point), when he received news that his two-year-old daughter was critically ill. He retired and flew from Antigua to Barbados to visit the hospital where his daughter was being treated; she died two days later. Greenidge took no further part in the match. As a mark of respect, he was recorded as "retired not out".

In Twenty20 (T20) cricket, teams sometimes retire a batsman for purely tactical reasons, such as to switch left- and right-handed batsmen, though this practice has been controversial and lambasted as unsporting. The first example at professional level was in a match between Bhutan and Maldives at the 2019 South Asian Games, when Sonam Tobgay of Bhutan retired out at the end of the 19th over. In the 2022 Indian Premier League, R Ashwin retired out while playing for Rajasthan Royals against Lucknow Super Giants. In June 2022, during the 2022 T20 Blast match between the Birmingham Bears and the Notts Outlaws, Carlos Brathwaite (Birmingham Bears) and Samit Patel (Notts Outlaws) both retired out for tactical reasons.

See also
List of unusual dismissals in international cricket

References

Cricket laws and regulations
Batting (cricket)
Cricket terminology